Wisner is a town in Franklin Parish, Louisiana, United States. The population was 964 at the 2010 census, down from 1,140 in 2000.

History
Wisner was founded by Edward Wisner, a native of Athens, Michigan, whose family came from Switzerland and originally settled in Orange County, New York, in the early 1700s.

The Holly Grove Colored Baptist Church in Wisner was established in the post-slavery period after the Civil War through the work of pastor Eldridge King David Swayzer. One of Swayzer's descendants, Frances Swayzer Conley, an English professor at Bossier Parish Community College in Bossier City and a resident of Shreveport, has written a pictorial family history entitled Home to Holly Grove: Cherishing Our Rich Heritage.

Geography
Wisner is located in southern Franklin Parish along U.S. Route 425, which leads north  to Winnsboro, the parish seat, and south  to Sicily Island.

Demographics

As of the census of 2000, there were 1,140 people, 398 households, and 280 families residing in the town. The racial makeup of the town was 63.33% White, 35.53% African American, 0.18% Native American, 0.09% from other races, and 0.88% from two or more races. Hispanic or Latino of any race were 1.40% of the population.

There were 398 households, out of which 34.2% had children under the age of 18 living with them, 47.2% were married couples living together, 19.6% had a female householder with no husband present, and 29.6% were non-families. 26.9% of all households were made up of individuals, and 12.8% had someone living alone who was 65 years of age or older. The average household size was 2.57 and the average family size was 3.11.

In the town, the population was spread out, with 26.8% under the age of 18, 6.8% from 18 to 24, 23.5% from 25 to 44, 21.0% from 45 to 64, and 21.8% who were 65 years of age or older. The median age was 40 years. For every 100 females, there were 87.2 males. For every 100 females age 18 and over, there were 81.3 males.

The median income for a household in the town was $21,654, and the median income for a family was $23,929. Males had a median income of $25,938 versus $15,156 for females. The per capita income for the town was $10,528. About 30.2% of families and 38.7% of the population were below the poverty line, including 58.6% of those under age 18 and 18.1% of those age 65 or over.

Notable people
J. C. Gilbert, farmer, rancher, and Louisiana state legislator from 1960 to 1976; born in Wisner, graduated from Wisner High School in 1940
Wayne Watson - Contemporary Christian music artist

References

External links
 Wisner Progress Community Progress Site for Wisner, LA

Towns in Louisiana
Towns in Franklin Parish, Louisiana